Louis Bramson established the Royal Photo View Company in Louisville, Kentucky, in 1904. In 1908, the company was renamed the Royal Photo Company. The Royal Photo Company focused on commercial photography and, unlike many other photographic businesses, did not operate a studio for portraits. Clients included Hillerich & Bradsby—makers of the Louisville Slugger baseball bat—and other businesses such as Southern Bell Telephone & Telegraph Company, Brown & Williamson Tobacco Corporation, and the Kaufman-Straus department store. 

Stern Bramson (1912–1989), the son of Louis Bramson, joined the studio upon graduation from DuPont Manual High School in 1930 and remained with the firm until 1972 except for a break for service with the Army Signal Corps during World War II. He eventually became Royal's principal photographer and was the owner of the studio after the death of his father.

The University of Louisville Photographic Archives acquired the Royal Photo Company collection of photographic negatives in 1982.

References 
 Carner, Bill. "Stern Bramson and the Royal Photo Company, Louisville, Kentucky." The History of Photography 19:1 (1996): 50-54.

External links
 Royal Photo Company Collection at the University of Louisville Libraries

Photography companies of the United States
Commercial photographers
American companies established in 1904
Defunct companies based in Louisville, Kentucky
American companies disestablished in 1972
1904 establishments in Kentucky
1972 disestablishments in Kentucky